Strethall is a village and a civil parish in the Uttlesford District, in the English county of Essex, near the town of Saffron Walden.

Having suffered no casualties in World War I it is known as one of the thankful villages.

The Icknield Way Path passes through the village on its 110-mile route between Ivinghoe Beacon in Buckinghamshire and Knettishall Heath in Suffolk. The  A route for walkers, horse riders and off-road cyclists also passes through the village.

References

External links
 Skullduggery in the History of Strethall
 The Hundred Parishes: link to an introduction to STRETHALL

See also
 The Hundred Parishes

Villages in Essex
Uttlesford
Civil parishes in Essex